Benny and Babloo is a 2010 Bollywood satirical comedy film, produced by Umesh Chouhan and directed by noted screenwriter Yunus Sajawal. The film was released in October 2010 under the Chamunda Films banner. The film stars Kay Kay Menon, Rajpal Yadav, Riya Sen, Shweta Tiwari, Rukhsar Rehman, Anita Hassanandani, Richa Chadda, Maushumi Udeshi, Hiten Paintal and Aasif Sheikh in prominent roles.

Plot
Smitten by the glamor of Mumbai, two friends, Benny and Babloo land up in distinctly different jobs: Benny as the bellboy of a five-star hotel, and Babloo as a waiter in a ladies service bar.

Benny believes his job is better than Babloo's and repeatedly ridicules him. Benny's pride fades away as they both realize that, although their jobs may look different viewed from the outside, they're quite similar seen from the inside.

Benny witnesses several criminal activities at the hotel, from drug abuse to political scandal, while Babloo sees the human side of the ladies bar. In the end, the truth stares them in the face that five-star hotels are the moral juniors to ladies bars

Cast

 Shweta Tiwari as Sheena
 Kay Kay Menon as Benny Kutti
 Rajpal Yadav as Babloo Charan Lathi
 Aasif Sheikh as Negi
 Riya Sen as Riya
 Kishori Shahane as Mrs. Tejwani
 Hussain Sheikh as Raju - Bar Owner
 Hiten Paintal as Ronnie
 Rukhsar Rehman as Hema / Parveen
 Anita Hassanandani as Esha / Sarita
 Kiran Janjani as Ranveer
 Richa Chadha as Fedora / Marina
 Anangsha Biswas as Sony / Akruti
 Anant Jog as Ratnath Gaikwad
 Maushmi Udeshi as Dancer
 Ravi Pandey as DJ Roger

Music
"Jabse Dil Diya Hai" - Himani Kapoor, Sukhwinder Singh
"Dolly" - Kalpana Patowary, Master Saleem

Release
The film released on 10 October 2010.

References

External links

Benny and Babloo Cast and Crew Details - Bollywood Hungama

2010 films
2010s Hindi-language films
Films scored by Anand Raj Anand